The Côte de La Redoute is a climb, often included in the Liège–Bastogne–Liège cycle route. It is located in Wallonia in the municipality of Aywaille and its incline is 1.6 km long with an average of 9.5%. It is named after a redoubt in the battle of Sprimont, which occurred at the village of Fontin, which is located on it, in the municipality of Esneux. It also runs along an access route to autoroute E25 level with the town of Remouchamps. The region is the birthplace of cyclist Philippe Gilbert.

Liège–Bastogne–Liège
Climbs in cycle racing in Belgium
Mountains and hills of the Ardennes (Belgium)
Mountains and hills of Liège Province
Aywaille